Cristian Camilo Salcedo Codazi (born 27 July 1992) is a Colombian boxer. He competed in the men's super heavyweight event at the 2020 Summer Olympics.

References

External links
 

1992 births
Living people
Colombian male boxers
Olympic boxers of Colombia
Boxers at the 2020 Summer Olympics
Place of birth missing (living people)
Pan American Games medalists in boxing
Pan American Games silver medalists for Colombia
Medalists at the 2019 Pan American Games
20th-century Colombian people
21st-century Colombian people
People from Tunja
Competitors at the 2018 South American Games
Competitors at the 2022 South American Games
South American Games gold medalists for Colombia
South American Games bronze medalists for Colombia